Danger 5 is an Australian action comedy television series which premiered on SBS One on 27 February 2012. The men's adventure-magazine-inspired series was created by Dario Russo and David Ashby. The first series is set in a bizarre, campy, 1960s interpretation of World War II and follows a group of five international spies on a mission to kill Adolf Hitler and thwart his plans of world domination. The second series is set in a similarly bizarre interpretation of 1982, with Hitler again the villain after somehow surviving the end of the war. The second series began airing on SBS 2 on 4 January 2015.

Project history

Development
After the success of the web series Italian Spiderman created by Alrugo Entertainment (Russo, Ashby, Tait Wilson, Will Spartalis and Boris Repasky), Australian broadcaster SBS became interested in turning the project into an interstitial television show. Due to ownership and copyright issues within the production team, the project fell through. Nonetheless, SBS were still interested in Russo and Ashby and in 2009 offered a development deal for a new show. Russo and Ashby submitted three concepts that, regardless of which was chosen, they would be happy to make. Danger 5 was the chosen concept, the most ambitious and dense of the three.

Broadcast 
A prologue web series entitled Danger 5: The Diamond Girls was released weekly on YouTube throughout November and December 2011, in the lead up to the Australian broadcast. The series itself premiered on SBS One on 27 February 2012.

On 11 September 2014, the crew announced that series 2 had been delayed due to unforeseen international news events and the recent ISIS actions. They released the series two trailer on the same day. The second series began airing on SBS 2 on 4 January 2015.

Setting and style

The first series is nominally set in World War II but uses a style more akin to a TV spy series. The titular Danger 5 are a small group of Allied agents who are tasked with stopping various schemes overseen by Adolf Hitler. Each episode sees an intentionally ahistorical version of a major Axis person come up with a bizarre plan more in line with a TV or comic book villain of the 1950s or 60s—stealing monuments from Allied nations to build an absurd Nazi super-monument, resurrecting dinosaurs, running a fixed casino to make weapons from gold and reprogramming captured airmen as Japanese pilots.

The series adds a further layer of satire by intentionally aping the production and dated values. Obvious studio sets are used for outdoor shots, model work is intentionally poor, usually featuring unrealistic movements and visible strings, the characters often laugh at bad puns immediately following the deaths of allies. All drink and smoke conspicuously while non-white characters are often played by Caucasians with poor make-up. Stock footage is also used, most notably a shot of Hitler jumping through a glass window to escape that is reused in settings that feature no such window.

Further surreal humour comes from the characters treating their universe seriously and not questioning various situations that are inexplicable to the viewer.

Cast and characters

Characters

Danger 5
A team of five Allied operatives repeatedly given bizarre missions by Colonel Chestbridge, not to mention responsibility for killing Hitler. All are highly trained, happy to kill without feeling any remorse, drink alcohol casually before, during, and after what are pitched as serious military operations, and chain-smoke.

Jackson
Jackson (David Ashby) is a macho and fiercely patriotic American, once abandoning the team in a futile attempt to prevent Hitler stealing the Statue of Liberty. He clashes frequently with Tucker on missions due to having a hedonistic and selfish approach to work. Jackson harbours an unrequited crush on Ilsa and reads Real Man Magazine.

Ilsa
Ilsa (Nataša Ristić) is a Russian, and speaks all of her dialogue in Russian with subtitles, which everyone understands without comment. She wears her uniform with as much flesh showing as possible and sees little problem with using sex to help the team in their missions (once distracting Joseph Goebbels by performing oral sex on him) or even if she just feels like it. This may be due to the staid lack of emotions Russians in the series have. She feels Claire is a prude and is aware of Jackson's feelings for her but seems indifferent. Ilsa is also a former wife of Erwin Rommel.

Tucker
Tucker is an uptight Australian member of the team. He is straight-laced to the point that hearing bossa nova causes him to suffer nosebleeds while he is often irked by the rest of the team being so easily distracted, though he is frequently undermined when they prove successful. He is a fan of Sensible Chuckle magazine and is in love with Claire, who saves him from becoming an indestructible Japanese robot-man. He later woos her with a self-written piece for the recorder and they finally kiss when the team seemingly kill Hitler in a tokusatsu mech battle, ending World War II. Despite being portrayed in-universe as a square he still partakes in the same level of drinking and smoking as everyone else.

At the start of the second series they are preparing to get married when Claire is murdered by a returning Hitler. A grief-stricken Tucker attempts to turn himself into a brooding revenge-driven ninja in response but turns out to be inept. Throughout the series, he suffers flashbacks of Claire's beheading and carries her head around with him.

Claire
Claire is a Cambridge graduate and a prim, chaste English woman. She is frequently uncomfortable around Ilsa and Jackson's openly sexual behaviour and initially frosty towards Tucker's more reserved approaches, though in the latter case she eventually relents. Claire is easily the most intelligent and capable member of the team. In an intentional comment on the sexism of the shows Danger 5 is spoofing, she is largely ignored; Colonel Chestbridge especially takes great pleasure in belittling the usually salient points she raises during briefings.

She is set to marry Tucker at the start of the second series but is killed on the day of her wedding.

Pierre
Pierre is of hazy European origin and obsessed with making the team cocktails. There are a series of recurring jokes around the character—wherever the team are sent he seemingly unexpectedly runs into an old acquaintance who knows him by a different name and hints at a mysterious past for Pierre; said acquaintance then dies in his arms partway through the episode, imparting a "perfect" cocktail recipe with their dying words.

Pierre is the easiest-going member of the team and something of a neutral between the headstrong Jackson & Ilsa and the conservative Tucker & Claire. He is also the only member of the team to ever show any sort of emotional reaction to the repeated deaths of most of those unfortunate enough to get involved in a Danger 5 mission. The rest of the team are always oblivious to these moments.

In series 2, Pierre is played by Pacharo Mzembe. The change is never mentioned in the series, even when he goes back in time and interacts with his past self (played by the original actor). Between series 1 and 2, Pierre has become an internationally famous musician. He is widely recognised by the general public and beats Johnny Hitler for the title of Christmas King due to his fame. In the episode "Un Sacco Di Natale", Pierre tells the Nazis disguised as priests that he is Catholic.

Kilroy
A sixth member of the team inexplicably introduced partway through the series 1 finale, Kilroy is a cel-animated anthropomorphic dog. His cartoon nature is never mentioned by anyone, nor is his sudden appearance. He largely speaks in hackneyed surfer vernacular until he is fatally shot in the head by Hitler midway through the episode. After imparting a dying cocktail recipe to Pierre he is never seen, mentioned or referenced ever again.

Colonel Chestbridge
The team's superior who gives them their missions, which always finish with a reminder to "kill Hitler". He has a bird's head which, in keeping with the show's style of humour, is neither explained nor mentioned by any of the characters. The Colonel displays open irritation and contempt for Claire and grows more irascible as the first series goes on due to the team's failures to kill Hitler and end the war, escalating to using a shotgun to keep order during a briefing.

He is seemingly retired at the start of the second series but is targeted and killed by Hitler.

Episodes

Series 1 (2012)
This list is ordered by the original air dates on SBS One in Australia.

Series 2 (2015)
Series 2 began airing on 4 January 2015.

Legacy
Danger 5 has been released on Netflix in the United States, Australia, Ireland, New Zealand and the United Kingdom.

A brand-new series of audio stories featuring the original cast was released in 2020 via Audible.

References

External links
Danger 5 official website (archived)

Dinosaur official website
Dinosaur YouTube channel

Australian action television series
Cultural depictions of Adolf Hitler
Cultural depictions of Adolf Eichmann
Cultural depictions of Erwin Rommel
Cultural depictions of Heinrich Himmler
Cultural depictions of Nikita Khrushchev
Cultural depictions of Hermann Göring
Cultural depictions of Benito Mussolini
Cultural depictions of Joseph Stalin
Cultural depictions of Joseph Goebbels
Cultural depictions of Hirohito
Cultural depictions of Josef Mengele
Australian comedy television series
Special Broadcasting Service original programming
2012 Australian television series debuts
2015 Australian television series endings
English-language television shows
World War II television comedy series
Television series about World War II alternate histories
Television series set in the 1980s
Australian fantasy television series
Australian action adventure television series
Surreal comedy television series
Black comedy television shows
Australian science fiction television series
Science fantasy television series